Tour Aotearoa is an annual cycle tour event and cycling route in New Zealand. The route travels  from Cape Reinga to Bluff.

Tour Aotearoa's debut event in 2016 included about 250 riders. The event was organised by Jonathan Kennett, a manager of the New Zealand Cycle Trail project. Kennett said that as the Cycle Trail project manager, he was often asked what was the best route from Cape Reinga to Bluff, which was part of the inspiration for the event. Kennett described the route in 2016 as a "mix of off-road trails, back-country roads, a few bits of highway, and even 90 Mile Beach", and that more sections would move off-road every month as more cycle trails were built.

The event is a brevet, meaning that it is not a race and cyclists ride at their own pace, though participants are expected to complete the challenge in under 30 days and reach 30 photo checkpoints, as well as carry all their own gear. The event was biannual, held in 2016, 2018, and 2020, then moved to yearly with an event in 2021.

The New Zealand Herald reported that Jackson Kelly was believed to be the youngest person to complete the event, at age 16. Kelly and his father entered the event in 2021 and completed the route over 28 days.

Route
Writer Graeme Simpson said in 2018 that although the route was only a few years old, "it's already one of New Zealand's great cycling adventures and is recognised as one of the best in the world, too."

The route is a mix of sealed roads, gravel roads, 4WD tracks, cycle trails and mountain bike tracks. The route segments are selected to include as many Great Rides as possible and avoid high traffic main roads. Route segments are updated as new trail is created.

All cycling on the route is free and open to the public all year round, however the route does require four or five commercial boat rides: Hokianga Harbour, Kaipara Harbour (optional), Wanganui River, Cook Strait, and Lake Wakatipu.

Main route segments
North Island
 Far North Cycleway Ninety Mile Beach
 Kauri Coast Cycleway
 Kaipara Missing Link
 Hauraki Rail Trail
 Waikato River Trail
 Timber Trail
 Kaiwhakauka Track
 Bridge to Nowhere Mountain Biking Trail
 Mountains to Sea
 The Three Rivers
 Manawatu Cycleway
 Remutaka Cycle Trail

South Island
 Queen Charlotte Drive
 Maungatapu Track
 Great Taste Trail
 Pioneer Heritage Trail
 Big River and Waiuta Track
 West Coast Wilderness Trail
 Haast Pass
 Crown Range
 Queenstown Trail
 Around the Mountains Cycle Trail
 Southland Traverse

See also
 Te Araroa – the tramping/walking route from Cape Reinga to Bluff

References

External links
 
 
 

Cycling events
Cycling in New Zealand
Ultra-distance cycling